Pasi Jaakonsaari (born 27 March 1959) is a Finnish former footballer. During his club career, Jaakonsaari played for HIFK, Grankulla IFK, HJK Helsinki, Gefle IF, Vasalunds IF, Geylang International FC and FinnPa. He made 11 appearances for the Finland national football team between 1980 and 1982, scoring 4 goals.

External links

1959 births
Finnish footballers
Finland international footballers
HIFK players
Grankulla IFK players
Helsingin Jalkapalloklubi players
Gefle IF players
Vasalunds IF players
Geylang International FC players
FinnPa players
Association football defenders
Living people
People from Riihimäki
Sportspeople from Kanta-Häme
20th-century Finnish people